Arietta may refer to:

a short aria
Arietta, New York, a town
, a cargo ship
USS Arletta (1860), a Union Navy schooner during the American Civil War

See also
Arrieta (disambiguation)